Leeder may refer to:

 Cyril Leeder (born 1959), president of the Ottawa Senators professional ice hockey team
 S.H. Leeder
 William George Leeder (1845-1906) was the mayor of Newcastle, Western Australia several times between 1878 and 1899.
 William Henry Leeder was an early settler in the Swan River Colony, Western Australia.

See also
 Leader (disambiguation)